Newlands is one of the northern suburbs of Wellington, New Zealand. It lies approximately 8.1 km north of the city centre and to the east of its nearest neighbour Johnsonville. It has a long history of early settlement and originally was farmed including being the early source of Wellington's milk.  Newlands is located in a valley and covers two ridgelines, the side of one of which overlooks Wellington Harbour and up to the Hutt Valley.

History

The area that modern Newlands occupies was originally known as Papararangi which is te reo Māori for "cluster of hills". A 40 ha area was sold during the 1840–41 land ballots run by the New Zealand Company. There are two theories to the suburb's name. The first is that it was named after Thomas Newland, who arrived in New Zealand from London in 1875 aboard the ship Avalanche and ran a business making glue and oil in neighboring Johnsonville before becoming manager of the manure department of the Wellington Meat Export Company's works in 1892. Thomas Newland was close friends of Walter Futter who owned land in Newlands. The second theory is that it was simply the "New Land" near Johnsonville.

The area was mostly used as a pig and dairy farm, providing Wellington most of their town milk supply from the 1920s to the 1950s. Dairy farms were run by Bill Miles of Newlands Dairy Limited who purchased James Purchase’s farm in Glanmire Rd and ran 100 cows, also Pearce and Tristram. After the Second World War Miles subdivided for housing; initially in Wakely Road, then in Miles Crescent, Lyndfield Lane, Black Rock Road and Glanmire Road. Ernest Hoskings grazed his dairy herd in Johnsonville, Newlands and Horokiwi.

Newlands was the location of the 1923 "Newlands Baby Farmers", where Daniel Cooper was found guilty and executed for murder, performing illegal abortions and baby farming.

Brandon's Rock, the highest point in Newlands, has a history of its own. Brandon's Rock was named after distinguished lawyer and politician Alfred de Bathe Brandon. Brandon also happened to be the father of the mayor of Wellington, who held the position from 1893 till 1894. Traces of gold were discovered on Brandon's Rock by prospectors in 1870, but tests showed that the gold was not pure enough and the search for the metal halted for many years. Although another group sought after gold on Brandon's Rock a decade later, this too proved unprofitable. It is thought by some that Gold could still be discovered in the area. Brandon's Rock was nicknamed Nun's Cap by sailors and those familiar with the harbour before the existence of harbour beacons. Sailors learned to use Brandon's Rock as a navigational point and also to avoid Barrett Reef by staying east of the imaginary line between it and Point Gordon.

A war memorial was erected after World War I at the crossroads of the gorge road; the original memorial was replaced after World War II because of road widening. Listing local dead from both world wars, it is now located on the corner of Newlands and Wakely road

Demographics

Newlands had a population of 7,824 at the 2018 New Zealand census, an increase of 549 people (7.5%) since the 2013 census, and an increase of 1,068 people (15.8%) since the 2006 census. There were 2,739 households. There were 3,879 males and 3,942 females, giving a sex ratio of 0.98 males per female, with 1,626 people (20.8%) aged under 15 years, 1,635 (20.9%) aged 15 to 29, 3,891 (49.7%) aged 30 to 64, and 669 (8.6%) aged 65 or older.

Ethnicities were 60.0% European/Pākehā, 11.5% Māori, 7.8% Pacific peoples, 28.7% Asian, and 5.0% other ethnicities (totals add to more than 100% since people could identify with multiple ethnicities).

The proportion of people born overseas was 35.4%, compared with 27.1% nationally.

Although some people objected to giving their religion, 44.4% had no religion, 32.8% were Christian, 7.5% were Hindu, 2.7% were Muslim, 2.4% were Buddhist and 3.6% had other religions.

Of those at least 15 years old, 2,067 (33.3%) people had a bachelor or higher degree, and 636 (10.3%) people had no formal qualifications. The employment status of those at least 15 was that 3,720 (60.0%) people were employed full-time, 804 (13.0%) were part-time, and 267 (4.3%) were unemployed.

Geography 
Newlands is approximately 138 m above sea level, with its highest point being Brandon's Rock, which lies along the Paparangi Ridge. The Paparangi Ridge runs along the harbour and stretches from Ngauranga Gorge to Horokiwi. Gilberd Bush Reserve lies to the east of Newlands, towards State Highway 2, and is located where the topography is too steep and hilly for use. Newlands is situated not far from the Wellington Fault, which is capable of producing earthquakes of magnitude 8.

Weather 
The warmest month of the year for Newlands is February, while the coldest month is July. The average high temperature is 14.66 °C and the average low temperature is 11.95 °C,  making the climate fairly moderate throughout the year without major fluctuations.

Facilities
Newlands town centre contains a New World supermarket, a community centre and medical services along with several other stores. Johnsonville mall and nearby public facilities are also a short distance away.

Community centre
The Newlands Community Centre was opened in 2009 and is home to a drop in centre, Newlands Toy Library and many community groups.

Volunteer fire brigade
Newlands Volunteer Fire Brigade was established in 1965 on Newlands Road and has 22 members and one appliance; a 2020 Iveco type 1 pumping appliance.

Parks and reserves

Newlands has a number of parks and reserves, including:
Newlands Park and Pukehuia playground
Pinkerton Park
Seton Nossiter Park
Waihinahina park
Gilberd Bush Reserve
Edgecombe Street play area
Kenmore Street Play Area
Lyndfield Lane play area
Cheyne Walk play area
Salford Street Play Area

Religious sites 

 St. Michael and All Angels Anglican Church
 St. Andrews Catholic Church
 Newlands Baptist Church
 Newlands Christian Assembly
 Kingdom Hall of Jehovahs Witnesses
 Kurinchi Kumaran Temple
 Hare Krishna (ISKCON) Temple

Transport

Roads 
Newlands is connected to Ngauranga, and further Wellington via the Ngauranga Gorge towards the South, and through Stewart Drive and Johnsonville to Porirua to the North via State Highway 1, constructed in the 1960s.

Bus services 
Newlands is served by several bus services which link it to the wider Wellington area, operated by Newlands Coach Services on behalf of Metlink Wellington. Several of these services link Newlands with the nearby Johnsonville, where further transport options are available.

Newlands Coach Services operates a bus depot next to the State Highway 1 overbridge.

Education

School enrollment zones

Newlands is within the enrollment zones for Newlands College, Newlands School and St Oran's College.

Secondary education
Newlands College is a state coeducational secondary school located on Bracken Road in Newlands.

Primary and intermediate education
Newlands has three primary schools and one intermediate school:

Newlands School is a contributing primary school located on Newlands Road with a roll of 
Rewa Rewa School is a contributing primary school located on Padnell Crescent with a roll of 
Bellevue School is a contributing primary school located on Bancroft Terrace with a roll of

References

External links
The Newlands baby farmers of 1923 
Newlands Primary School
Newlands Medical Centre

Suburbs of Wellington City